Morchella septentrionalis species of fungus in the family Morchellaceae native North America. Described as new to science in 2012, it has a northerly eastern North American distribution, where it occurs north of 44°N. The fungus fruits under hardwoods, particularly American aspen (Populus grandidentata) and American ash (Fraxinus americana).

References

External links

septentrionalis
Edible fungi
Fungi described in 2012
Fungi of North America